Statistics of Swiss Super League football (soccer) competition in the 1965–66 season.

Overview
Fourteen teams contested the 1965–66 Nationalliga A. These were the top 12 teams from the previous 1964–65 season and the two newly promoted teams Urania Genève Sport and Young Fellows Zürich. Zürich won the championship with 42 points and qualified for 1966–67 European Cup. They were seven points ahead of Servette in second place. Servette won the Swiss Cup and qualified for the 1966–67 Cup Winners' Cup.

League standings

Results

References

Sources
 Switzerland 1965–66 at RSSSF

Swiss Football League seasons
Swiss
1965–66 in Swiss football